Franklinothrips is a genus of thrips with pantropical distribution.

Name
The genus name is derived from the surname of entomologist H. J. Franklin, who described thrips taxa in the early 1900s. The thrips genus Frankliniella is also named after him. Franklin worked at the entomology department of the University of Massachusetts Amherst in the 1930s.

Reproduction

Most species are apparently bisexual (have both males and females) and occur only in small areas. An exception is F. vespiformis, which is unisexual (mostly females) and occurs in many tropical countries. Only few males were produced during rearing programmes involving F. vespiformis.

Mimicry
The fast-running females are easily misidentified as ants or bethylid wasps (superfamily Chrysidoidea). Particularly the African species F. megalops very closely mimics ants in its behavior and body form. Males are less ant-like in appearance. They are smaller, have longer antennae and a less constricted waist.

Feeding behavior
F. orizabensis is known to be unable to survive solely on plant food. It is used as a control agent against thrips on avocado trees. Together with F. vespiformis it has been marketed in Europe as a control agent against thrips in greenhouses. F. vespiformis also feeds on mites, nymphs of a whitefly species and the larvae of an agromyzid fly. F. megalops has been used for thrips control in "internal landscapes".

Taxonomy

The three neotropical species F. orizabensis, F. tenuicornis and F. vespiformis are closely related.

The species F. megalops, F. rarosae and F. variegatus appear to part of a cline across the Old World tropics from Africa to Australia, with F. rarosae being intermediate in appearance as well as distribution.

The only genus closely related to Franklinothrips is Corynothripoides from Africa, and its only species, C. marginipennis, could even belong to the same genus.

F. caballeroi and F. suzukii are possibly the same species, with one having been distributed through horticultural trade.

References

 Includes key to species and color photographs.
 Thrips of the World Checklist: Genus Franklinothrips

Insects of Africa
Thrips genera
Terebrantia
Insects of Asia
Pantropical fauna